Vitaliy Pervak (born 15 August 1970) is a former Ukrainian footballer and manager.

External links
 Vitaliy Pervak: "I play to this day possible because beer I started to drink later" (Віталій Первак: "Можливо тому досі граю, що пізно почав пити пиво"). UA-Football. 25 June 2009
 
 

1970 births
Living people
People from Starokostiantyniv
Ukrainian footballers
Association football defenders
FC Krasyliv players
FC Karpaty Mukacheve players
FC Oleksandriya players
FC Volyn Lutsk players
FC Nyva Ternopil players
FC Spartak Ivano-Frankivsk players
FC Prykarpattia-2 Ivano-Frankivsk players
FC Nyva Vinnytsia players
Ukrainian Premier League managers
FC Oleksandriya managers
Ukrainian Premier League players
Ukrainian football managers
Sportspeople from Khmelnytskyi Oblast